Gerald Gibbs is the name of:

Gerald Gibbs, 3rd Baron Aldenham, British peer
Sir Gerald Gibbs (RAF officer) (1896–1992), British RAF officer
Gerald Gibbs (cinematographer) (1907–1990), British film technician